Sir Thomas de la Dale (c.1317–1373) was an English-born judge and landowner, who held the office of Lord Chief Justice of Ireland, and also served as Lord Deputy of Ireland.

Biography 

He was born at Little Barford, Bedfordshire, son of Thomas de la Dale, who married the heiress of Barford, Isabel de Leyham, daughter of Matthew de Leyham, in 1316. In 1346 "Thomas, son of Isabel" (who was almost certainly our Sir Thomas) was listed as the owner of Barford; he also inherited lands at Everton cum Tetworth in the same county. In 1358 he was exempted from the usual feudal duties of a landowner.

He was sent to Ireland in 1361, in the entourage of Lionel of Antwerp, Duke of Clarence, the Lord Lieutenant of Ireland; he remained in Ireland, apart from a few short intervals, until 1369, and may have spent time there in the early 1370s. He was made Lord Chief Justice in 1365. He was also described as the "Governor of Ireland" when  Lionel returned to  England that year, leaving Thomas as his Deputy. He became Custos Rotulorum (Keeper of the Rolls) of Ireland in 1366, and his name appears as a witness in the Patent Rolls. In 1372 Robert Bron was made Chief Serjeant of County Carlow and County Louth on account of "his good services done in the company of Sir Thomas de la Dale, Sir William de Windsor and others".

He died in 1373: in his will he asked to be buried at Little Barford.

His son and heir, also named Sir Thomas de la Dale (died 1396), was a senior member of the household of Lionel's younger brother, John of Gaunt, Duke of Lancaster. He sometimes went by the alternative surname Fulthorpe, and was described as "a man of substance". Fulthorpe was succeeded by his son, who was yet another Thomas de la Dale. The de la Dales owned Barford until the male line of the family died out in the sixteenth century. The last of the de la Dales, Anne, daughter of William de la Dale, married Alexander Fettiplace in 1537. Their descendants remained at Barford until 1658.

References
Ball, F. Elrington The Judges in Ireland 1221-1921 John Murray London 1926
Irish Archaeological and Celtic Society Vol.2 1842
McFarlane, K.B. England in the Fifteenth Century-Collected Essays Hambleton Press London 1981
Page, William History of the County of Bedfordshire 1908

Footnotes

People from the Borough of Bedford
1310s births
1373 deaths
Lords chief justice of Ireland
Lords Lieutenant of Ireland
14th-century Irish judges
People from Bedfordshire